Clear Skies may refer to:

 Clear Skies Act of 2003 and 2005 in the United States
 Clear Skies microgeneration programme in the United Kingdom
 Clear Skies (film), a 1961 film by Soviet director Grigori Chukhrai
 Clear Skies (machinima), a machinima series based on the fictional universe of the game Eve Online
 ClearSkies™, an album by PrismCorp Virtual Enterprises